Govind Sadashiv Ghurye (12 December 1893 – 28 December 1983) was a pioneering Indian academic who was a professor of sociology. In 1924, he became the second person to head the Department of Sociology at the University of Bombay. And, is widely regarded as the founder of Indian Sociology & Sociology in India.

Early life
G S Ghurye was born, in a Saraswat Brahmin community on 12 December 1893, at Malvan, in present-day Maharashtra. His early schooling was at the Aryan Education Society's High School, Girgaum, in Bombay, and then at Bahadur Khanji High School, Junagadh, in the princely state of Junagadh. He joined Bahauddin college at Junagarh, in 1912, but moved on to Elphinstone College, Bombay, after a year, and received his B. A. (Sanskrit) and M. A. (Sanskrit) degrees from there. He earned the Bhau Daji prize with his B. A., and the Chancellor's gold medal with his M. A. degree. After completing his M. A., Ghurye received a scholarship for further studies in England, and earned his PhD from Cambridge University in 1922. Ghurye was deeply influenced by W. H. R. Rivers, who was his PhD guide. After Rivers' untimely death in 1922, he completed his thesis under A. C. Haddon.

Personal life
Ghurye was married to Sajubai of Vengurla, a town near Malwan. His son, Sudhish Ghurye is a Mathematician and Statistician, and daughter Kumud G. Ghurye was a barrister.

Career
Ghurye was appointed as Head of the Department of Sociology in Bombay University in 1924, and retired in 1959. The department was founded by Patrick Geddes in 1919.

However, when Ghurye took it over, it was on the verge of closure. The department came alive once again with Ghurye, and now, Ghurye is regarded as the real founder and "shaped" the study of sociology there from then on.

He also founded the Indian Sociological Society and its newsletter, Sociological Bulletin, and served as head for both. He also headed the Bombay Anthropological Society for some years.

After retirement, he served as Professor Emeritus for Bombay University and at least three festschrifts were produced in his honour, of which two were during his lifetime. He guided a total of 80 research theses and authored 32 books and a number of other papers. Later, at least two theses were written on him.

Among his students were personalities like noted social reformer and intellectual Dr. Uttamrao K. Jadhav, A. J. Agarkar, Y. M. Rege, L. N. Chapekar, M. G. Kulkarni, M. S. A. Rao, Iravati Karve, C. Rajagopalan, Y. B. Damle, M.N. Srinivas, A. R. Desai, D. Narain, I. P. Desai, M. S. Gore, Suma Chitnis and Victor D'Souza. He also had the opportunity to see the "Dr. G. S. Ghurye Award" being instituted in his honour. His book Caste and race in India is regarded as a classic in the field.

Publications

References
Notes

Citations

Bibliography

Further reading

External links

Professor G.S. Ghurye (1893–1983) 
Malvancity: Dr. G S Ghurye 

Indian sociologists
Indian anthropologists
Academic staff of the University of Mumbai
1893 births
1983 deaths
People from Sindhudurg district
Alumni of the University of Cambridge
Marathi people
Scholars from Maharashtra
20th-century Indian non-fiction writers
Indian male writers
Indian social sciences writers
20th-century anthropologists